Dominican Academy is an American Catholic college preparatory school for girls, located on the Upper East Side of the Manhattan borough of New York City, New York.

It was founded by the Dominican Sisters of St. Mary of the Springs (now Dominican Sisters of Peace).

44 East 68th Street

The mansion at 44 East 68th Street was built in 1921 as the private residence of Colonel Michael Friedsam, the former president of the B. Altman and Company and one of the premier art collectors in America at that time. 

The five-story building fashioned in limestone was designed by Frederick Frost, with wrought ironwork by Samuel Yellin. 

Many of the original architectural elements, including carved marble fireplaces, stained-glass windows, and ornate woodwork, are still in place today creating a unique environment for learning.

Friedsam's art collection contained numerous masterpieces by artists including 
Botticelli, Rembrandt, Jan van Eyck, and Vermeer. 

Upon Friedsam's death, his collection, valued at $10,000,000 (in 1931), was split between the Metropolitan Museum of Art and the Brooklyn Museum. 

The house itself went to Friedsam's close friend, Benjamin Altman of B. Altman and Co., under the provision that it be used for educational purposes.

Many legends surround the ghost of Michael Friedsam. He is often heard in room 3 where he died. 

At that time, Altman sold the building to the Dominican Sisters for $1. 

At first, the only staircase in the building was the main red staircase. However, in 1956, the chapel was destroyed by a fire which led to the Dominican Sisters taking many more safety precautions and building an extra black staircase on the opposite side of the building.

The library, which previously held part of Friedsam's extensive art collection, has over 7,000 books with special art, literature, and classics collections. The library subscribes to more than 60 magazines and newspapers.

The science lab was renovated over the summer of 2010, underwritten by the generosity of the Reunion Class of 1958 and the family of a beloved deceased alumna.

Computers are readily available in the library, computer room and throughout the building for student use. 

The school underwent a major renovation in the summers of 2017 and 2018 which included the addition of two full-sized classrooms, a reconfigured library commons and dedicated chapel space, and additional student and faculty spaces.

Accreditation and awards
Established in 1897, the school is named for its founders, the Dominican Sisters. The Dominican Sisters of Peace continue to sponsor the school. 

The school's president is Sr. Margaret Ormond, O.P., former prioress of the Dominican Sisters of Peace, and a graduate of Dominican Academy.

The school is accredited by the  Middle States Association of Colleges and Schools, the  Board of Regents of the University of the State of New York, and has been recognized twice with the Blue Ribbon School Award of Excellence by the United States Department of Education, the highest award an American school can receive.

Academics

As a private Catholic college preparatory school, all of the school's classes are either honors, advanced, or Advanced Placement level. One hundred percent of each graduating class attends accredited four-year colleges and universities.

The 53 members of the class of 2018 were awarded over $13.5 million in scholarships and had one National Merit Commended Scholars (top 3 percent nationally) and one National Merit Semi-Finalist (top <.5 percent nationally). The 53 members of the class of 2017 were awarded over $10.5 million in college scholarships and grants. The 58 members of the class of 2016 were awarded over $14.5 million in college scholarships and grants, and had five National Merit Commended Scholars and one National Merit Finalist. The 39 members of the class of 2015 were awarded over $12 million in scholarships and grants. The 60 members of the class of 2014 earned over $15 million in college scholarships and grants, and had four National Merit Commended Scholars.

Total enrollment is 225 young women. There are 26 faculty members. The Student:Teacher ratio is 8:1. 

Students complete a curriculum in subjects including dance, English, fine arts, foreign language, history, mathematics, religious studies, science, and technology. Every student takes at least two years of Latin. Students must also study at least two years of French, Spanish, or Chinese. In total, every student must complete five years of foreign language. Electives available include art history, ballroom dance, forensics, prophets of nonviolence, and psychology.

Admissions
Admission is based on the student's Test for Admissions to Catholic High Schools (TACHS) score (see www.tachsinfo.com), grade school academic records, and her teachers’ recommendations.

The school does not discriminate on the basis of race, color, creed, or ethnic origin.

Extracurricular activities
Some activities offered at the school include: Art Club, Culture Club, Dance Club, Debate Club, Drama Club, French Club, Girls Who Code, Glee Club, Latin Club, Literary Journal, Liturgical Ensemble, Mock Trial Team, Psychology Club, Science Club, Shakespeare Club, The Student Prints (newspaper), Women's Empowerment Club, and Yearbook Club. 

The school's athletic teams  include basketball, cross-country track, soccer, softball, swimming, tennis, indoor and outdoor track, and volleyball.

Interested students in all grades have the opportunity to attend sketching classes taught by art professionals on-site at the Frick Collection. The Frick, located two blocks from the school, is one of the pre-eminent art museums in the United States and houses paintings by world-renowned artists including El Greco, Rembrandt, van Dyck, and Vermeer. Student work is on display at the Frick at the end of the school year.

Service activities
The school is committed to the Dominican pillars of prayer, study, community, and ministry. It celebrates mass monthly, and each class has a yearly retreat. Additionally, juniors and seniors have a special retreat program.

The school's service activities include: a week-long service to the Romero Center Ministries in Camden, New Jersey; a summer service trip to Ecuador; New York Cares Day; and opportunities to volunteer at local soup kitchens, homeless shelters, nursing homes, and daycare facilities. 

The school's service organizations at include Amnesty International, Campus Ministry, Liturgical Choir, National Honor Society, Students Against Destructive Decisions (SADD), Student Ambassadors, and Student Council. 

Each student is required to complete a certain number of service hours per year.

Notable alumnae 

 Margaret Heckler
 Sunny Hostin
 Makenzie Vega
 Willow Bay

References

External links
Dominican Academy

1897 establishments in New York City
Dominican schools in the United States
Educational institutions established in 1897
Girls' schools in New York City
Roman Catholic secondary schools in Manhattan
Upper East Side